Alexis Izard (born 15 June 1992) is a French politician from La République En Marche! and a member of the National Assembly for Essonne's 3rd constituency since 2022.

See also 

 List of deputies of the 16th National Assembly of France

References 

Living people
1992 births
21st-century French politicians
Deputies of the 16th National Assembly of the French Fifth Republic
La République En Marche! politicians
Members of Parliament for Essonne